Demi Okely (born 19 March 1997) is an Australian rules footballer who played for the Fremantle Football Club in the AFL Women's competition. Okely was drafted by Fremantle with their 16th selection and 125th overall in the 2016 AFL Women's draft. She played every match in her debut season to finish with seven matches. She was delisted at the end of the 2017 season.

References

External links 

1997 births
Living people
Fremantle Football Club (AFLW) players
Australian rules footballers from Western Australia
Indigenous Australian players of Australian rules football